Mom Luang Nattakorn Devakula (nicknamed Pleum b. 10 September 1976) is a Thai host and television moderator. He is a former candidate of 2009 Bangkok gubernatorial election.

History 
Devakula is the son of Mom Rajawongse Pridiyathorn Devakula, former governor of the Bank of Thailand.

Nattakorn married Natrada Apitananon or "Jacqueline" or "Jacqui" actor luk khrueng Thai-Canada on 7 October 2010. His son name Kritkuntorn Devakula Na Ayuttaya or Jame.

Education 
 Primary school : Srinakharinwirot University Prasarnmit Demonstration School (elementary/secondary)
 Secondary education : Oregon secondary education school
 Bachelor : Political science University of Wisconsin–Madison
 Master's : Johns Hopkins University

Work

Agencies  
 1997–2001 Interpreter and draftsman at Directorate of Intelligence, Royal Thai Army

Journalism work  
 Economic Time (TNN24)
 Wake up Thailand / Wake Up News (Voice TV)
 The Daily Dose (Voice TV)
 Cooking with Jacqui (Voice TV)
 Pluem Explore! (Voice TV)
 Talking Thailand (Voice TV)
 Tonight Thailand (Voice TV)

Advertising endorsements  
 Nissan Tiida
 Salz toothpaste

Movie 
 SOUL'S CODE (2008) role by Ganon

References

External links 
 ประวัติ ม.ล.ณัฏฐกรณ์ เทวกุล (women.sanook.com)
 ม.ล.ณัฐกรณ์ เทวกุล คุยเศรษฐกิจแบบฟุตฟิตฟอไฟ (POSITIONING MAGAZINE)
 ม.ล.ณัฏฐกรณ์ เทวกุล พิธีกรสุดฮอต (POSITIONING MAGAZINE)
 ประวัติ ม.ล.ณัฏฐกรณ์ เทวกุล (www.nangdee.com)
 แกะดำที่ไม่น่าปลื้ม (www.boringdays.net)
 จากคน กทม.ที่ฉลาดน้อยถึงคุณ “ปลื้ม” ที่ฉลาดมาก
 กึ๋นของ “ปลื้ม” มีอยู่แค่ไหน? พิสูจน์รอยหยักในสมองได้ที่นี่
 วิดีโอสัมภาษณ์ ม.ล.ณัฏฐกรณ์ เทวกุล บนอินเทอร์เน็ต

1976 births
Thai television personalities
Nattakorn Devakula
Living people
Nattakorn Devakula
Nattakorn Devakula